The Jubilee Greenway is a walking and cycling route in London, England. It was completed in 2012 to mark the Diamond Jubilee of Elizabeth II. The  route of continuous paths links 2012 Olympic and Paralympic venues with parks, waterways and other attractions.

Background
The Jubilee Greenway is part of the Inspire programme, run by the London Organising Committee of the 2012 Summer Olympics and 2012 Summer Paralympics.

Route
The Jubilee Greenway makes use of existing walking and cycling routes wherever possible beginning at Buckingham Palace and joining Green Park, Hyde Park and Kensington Gardens with Paddington Station and the Grand Union Canal at Little Venice. Following the Regent's Canal through Camden Town, The Greenway then connects to East London through Victoria Park to the River Thames where the Woolwich foot tunnel ties Greenwich and the South Bank to the Jubilee Walkway at Tower Bridge and back to St James's via Westminster.

References

External links
Jubilee Greenway
The Jubilee Greenway on the Go Jauntly app, in partnership with Transport for London.

Long-distance footpaths in England
Footpaths in London